The Lagerlunda rail accident occurred in the early hours of November 15, 1875 about 8 km west of Linköping in Östergötland, Sweden. Unclear signalling between a station master and a steam engine driver led to a train leaving the station although another train was approaching on the single line track. 9 people were killed in the head-on collision shortly after. The station master was sentenced to 6 months of prison.

A contemporary investigation by Swedish ophthalmologist Frithiof Holmgren suggested that color blindness on the part of the driver could have contributed to the accident, which prompted the introduction of mandatory color-vision screening of railroad personnel. However, more recent analyses dispute color blindness as the main cause of the accident.

References

Train collisions in Sweden
Railway accidents in 1875
November 1875 events
1875 disasters in Sweden